Guido Boni (4 November 1933 – 28 June 2014) was an Italian racing cyclist. He won stage 7 of the 1958 Giro d'Italia.

References

External links
 

1933 births
2014 deaths
Italian male cyclists
Italian Giro d'Italia stage winners
Place of birth missing
Sportspeople from the Metropolitan City of Florence
Cyclists from Tuscany
Tour de Suisse stage winners